Samuel Newhall Crane (January 2, 1854 – June 26, 1925) was an American second baseman and manager in Major League Baseball born in Springfield, Massachusetts. During two of those seasons, he acted as a player-manager, once for the 1880 Buffalo Bisons of the National League and the  Cincinnati Outlaw Reds of the short-lived Union Association.

Career
His career ended when he was arrested after having an affair with the wife of a fruit dealer and stealing $1,500 from the husband. After his playing days, Sam had a long and distinguished career as a sportswriter. In , when he was writing for the New York Advertiser, he had become the center of a controversy when he wrote an article that harshly criticized the owner of the New York Giants, Andrew Freedman. Freedman, upon learning of existence of the article, barred Sam from entering the Polo Grounds. When Crane showed up for the August 16 game, he learned that his season pass was taken and his efforts to purchase a ticket were foiled.

It was his connection to baseball as a player, manager, and sportswriter that lent credibility to his assertion that Cooperstown, New York be the location for a "memorial" to the great players from the past. Cooperstown was, at the time, the place that many people believed where Abner Doubleday had invented the game of baseball.

Crane died at the age of 71 of pneumonia in New York City, and is interred at the Lutheran All Faith Cemetery in Middle Village, New York.

See also
List of Major League Baseball player–managers

References

External links

1854 births
1925 deaths
19th-century baseball players
Baseball players from Springfield, Massachusetts
Major League Baseball second basemen
Buffalo Bisons (NL) players
Buffalo Bisons (NL) managers
New York Metropolitans players
Cincinnati Outlaw Reds players
Detroit Wolverines players
St. Louis Maroons players
Washington Nationals (1886–1889) players
New York Giants (NL) players
Pittsburgh Alleghenys players
Sportswriters from New York (state)
Lowell (minor league baseball) players
Rochester (minor league baseball) players
Springfield (minor league baseball) players
Worcester Grays players
Indianapolis Hoosiers (minor league) players
Scranton Miners players
Kansas City Cowboys (minor league) players
Lynn Lions players
Major League Baseball player-managers
Deaths from pneumonia in New York City
Sportswriters from Massachusetts